Esporte Clube Vitória (basketball) is a Brazilian professional basketball team located in the city of Salvador, Bahia (Brazil). The team competes in the Novo Basquete Brasil.

Notable players

 Arthur
 Kojo Mensah 
 Alvaro Calvo

References

External links
Presentation at league website 
Presentation at Latinbasket.com

Basketball teams in Brazil
Basketball teams established in 1899
Esporte Clube Vitória